Bossalinis & Fooliyones is the first studio album by American hip hop duo Main Attrakionz. It was released on Young One Records on October 22, 2012. The album is produced by Harry Fraud, Zaytoven, and Supreme Cuts, among others. It features vocal contributions from Gucci Mane and Shady Blaze.

Critical reception

At Metacritic, which assigns a weighted average score out of 100 to reviews from mainstream critics, Bossalinis & Fooliyones received an average score of 71, based on 11 reviews, indicating "generally favorable reviews".

Peter Marrack of Exclaim! gave the album an 8 out of 10, calling it "a taut, humble and profoundly aware medley of late afternoon joy ― the best time to listen to it." Zach Kelly of Pitchfork gave the album a 7.1 out of 10, saying, "Here are two guys who clearly love to rap and work hard at it, taking a style they can call their own, and presenting it in a more user-friendly way."

Bossalinis & Fooliyones was listed by Spin as the "Rap Release of the Week" on October 25, 2012. Fact placed it at number 25 on the "50 Best Albums of 2012" list. SF Weekly included it on the "10 Best Bay Area Hip-Hop Records of 2012" list.

Track listing

References

External links
 
 

2012 debut albums
Main Attrakionz albums
Albums produced by Harry Fraud
Albums produced by Zaytoven